The 1968 Louisiana Tech Bulldogs football team was an American football team that represented the Louisiana Polytechnic Institute (now known as Louisiana Tech University) as a member of the Gulf States Conference during the 1968 NCAA College Division football season. In their second year under head coach Maxie Lambright, the team compiled a 9–2 record.

Schedule

References

Louisiana Tech
Grantland Rice Bowl champion seasons
Louisiana Tech Bulldogs football seasons
Louisiana Tech Bulldogs football